Revesby is a village and civil parish in the East Lindsey district of Lincolnshire, England. The parish includes the hamlet of Moorhouses  to the south of Revesby village.

History

The parish includes the site of the Cistercian abbey of SS Mary and Lawrence, founded in 1142 and colonised by monks from Rievaulx Abbey. The abbey was suppressed through the 1538 Dissolution of the Lesser Monasteries Act. A post-restoration house was built close to the site of the abbey by Craven Howard. English Heritage styles the building Jacobean, with a build date of 1845. Revesby Abbey, with its stable yard, is Grade I listed. The deer park today holds an annual Revesby Country Fair.

The 1885 Kelly's Directory notes Sir Henry James Hawley and James Stanhope DL JP, as principal landowners. Stanhope was Lord of the Manor. The parish is described as partly upland and partly fen, on which chief crops grown were wheat, oats, barley, turnips and mangolds. Parish occupations in 1885 included twelve farmers, a farm bailiff, gamekeeper, head gardener, blacksmith, carpenter, land agent, surgeon, and the publican at the Red Lion public house. The parish post master was also a grocer and draper.

Civil parish population in 1921 was 457, and ecclesiastical parish, 375. Revesby Abbey was now the home of Lady Beryl Groves, Lady of the Manor, who, with Henry Cusack Wingfield, scion of the Hawley baronets, was principal landowner. Parish occupations in 1933 included nineteen farmers, one of whom was a landowner, and another a cottage farmer. There was a smallholder, a head gardener, two gamekeepers, a carpenter, a land agent, and the publican at the Red Lion public house. The post master and grocer had ceased to be a draper. Trades in 1933 not found in 1885 were a motor engineer—who hired-out cars and was a vehicle dealer, agent and repairer—and a motor and agricultural engineer.

Revesby Grade II listed Anglican church is dedicated to St Lawrence. The present church was built in Decorated style in 1891 on the site of a previous church built in 1733 by Revesby Abbey estate owner Joseph Banks, the great-grandfather of naturalist Sir Joseph Banks. The 1733 church was built on the site of an even earlier church. Parish registers date from 1595.

Notable people
John Chesser (architect) (1819 − 1892) – master-of-works at Revesby estate

References

External links

"Revesby", Genuki.org.uk. Retrieved 3 July 2011

Villages in Lincolnshire
Civil parishes in Lincolnshire
East Lindsey District